Hendrik Antoon Lorentz (18 July 1853 – 4 February 1928) was a Dutch physicist who shared the 1902 Nobel Prize in Physics with Pieter Zeeman for the discovery and theoretical explanation of the Zeeman effect. He derived the Lorentz transformation which Albert Einstein subsequently used to make  claims to special theory of relativity, as well as the Lorentz force, which describes the combined electric and magnetic forces acting on a charged particle in an electromagnetic field. Lorentz was also responsible for the Lorentz oscillator model, a classical model used to describe the anomalous dispersion observed in dielectric materials when the driving frequency of the electric field was near the resonant frequency, resulting in abnormal refractive indices. 

According to the biography published by the Nobel Foundation, "It may well be said that Lorentz was regarded by all theoretical physicists as the world's leading spirit, who completed what was left unfinished by his predecessors and prepared the ground for the fruitful reception of the new ideas based on the quantum theory." He received many other honours and distinctions, including a term as chairman of the International Committee on Intellectual Cooperation, the forerunner of UNESCO, between 1925 and 1928.

Biography

Early life
Hendrik Lorentz was born in Arnhem, Gelderland, Netherlands, the son of Gerrit Frederik Lorentz (1822–1893), a well-off horticulturist, and Geertruida van Ginkel (1826–1861). In 1862, after his mother's death, his father married Luberta Hupkes. Despite being raised as a Protestant, he was a freethinker in religious matters. From 1866 to 1869, he attended the "Hogere Burgerschool" in Arnhem, a new type of public high school recently established by Johan Rudolph Thorbecke. His results in school were exemplary; not only did he excel in the physical sciences and mathematics, but also in English, French, and German. In 1870, he passed the exams in classical languages which were then required for admission to University.

Lorentz studied physics and mathematics at Leiden University, where he was strongly influenced by the teaching of astronomy professor Frederik Kaiser; it was his influence that led him to become a physicist. After earning a bachelor's degree, he returned to Arnhem in 1871 to teach night school classes in mathematics, but he continued his studies in Leiden in addition to his teaching position. In 1875, Lorentz earned a doctoral degree under Pieter Rijke on a thesis entitled "" (On the theory of reflection and refraction of light), in which he refined the electromagnetic theory of James Clerk Maxwell.

Career

Professor in Leiden
On 17 November 1877, only 24 years of age, Lorentz was appointed to the newly established chair in theoretical physics at the University of Leiden. The position had initially been offered to Johan van der Waals, but he accepted a position at the Universiteit van Amsterdam. On 25 January 1878, Lorentz delivered his inaugural lecture on "" (The molecular theories in physics). In 1881, he became member of the Royal Netherlands Academy of Arts and Sciences.

During the first twenty years in Leiden, Lorentz was primarily interested in the electromagnetic theory of electricity, magnetism, and light. After that, he extended his research to a much wider area while still focusing on theoretical physics. Lorentz made significant contributions to fields ranging from hydrodynamics to general relativity. His most important contributions were in the area of electromagnetism, the electron theory, and relativity.

Lorentz theorized that atoms might consist of charged particles and suggested that the oscillations of these charged particles were the source of light. When a colleague and former student of Lorentz's, Pieter Zeeman, discovered the Zeeman effect in 1896, Lorentz supplied its theoretical interpretation. The experimental and theoretical work was honored with the Nobel prize in physics in 1902. Lorentz' name is now associated with the Lorentz–Lorenz equation, the Lorentz force, the Lorentzian distribution, the Lorentz oscillator model and the Lorentz transformation.

Electrodynamics and relativity

In 1892 and 1895, Lorentz worked on describing electromagnetic phenomena (the propagation of light) in reference frames that move relative to the postulated luminiferous aether. He discovered that the transition from one to another reference frame could be simplified by using a new time variable that he called local time and which depended on universal time and the location under consideration. Although Lorentz did not give a detailed interpretation of the physical significance of local time, with it, he could explain the aberration of light and the result of the Fizeau experiment. In 1900 and 1904, Henri Poincaré called local time Lorentz's "most ingenious idea" and illustrated it by showing that clocks in moving frames are synchronized by exchanging light signals that are assumed to travel at the same speed against and with the motion of the frame (see Einstein synchronisation and Relativity of simultaneity). In 1892, with the attempt to explain the Michelson–Morley experiment, Lorentz also proposed that moving bodies contract in the direction of motion (see length contraction; George FitzGerald had already arrived at this conclusion in 1889).

In 1899 and again in 1904, Lorentz added time dilation to his transformations and published what Poincaré in 1905 named Lorentz transformations.
It was apparently unknown to Lorentz that Joseph Larmor had used identical transformations to describe orbiting electrons in 1897. Larmor's and Lorentz's equations look somewhat dissimilar, but they are algebraically equivalent to those presented by Poincaré and Einstein in 1905. Lorentz's 1904 paper includes the covariant formulation of electrodynamics, in which electrodynamic phenomena in different reference frames are described by identical equations with well defined transformation properties. The paper clearly recognizes the significance of this formulation, namely that the outcomes of electrodynamic experiments do not depend on the relative motion of the reference frame. The 1904 paper includes a detailed discussion of the increase of the inertial mass of rapidly moving objects in a useless attempt to make momentum look exactly like Newtonian momentum; it was also an attempt to explain the length contraction as the accumulation of "stuff" onto mass making it slow and contract.

Lorentz and special relativity

In 1905, Einstein would use many of the concepts, mathematical tools and results Lorentz discussed to write his paper entitled "On the Electrodynamics of Moving Bodies", known today as the special theory of relativity. Because Lorentz laid the fundamentals for the work by Einstein, this theory was originally called the Lorentz–Einstein theory.

In 1906, Lorentz's electron theory received a full-fledged treatment in his lectures at Columbia University, published under the title The Theory of Electrons.

The increase of mass was the first prediction of Lorentz and Einstein to be tested, but some experiments by Kaufmann appeared to show a slightly different mass increase; this led Lorentz to the famous remark that he was "au bout de mon latin" ("at the end of my [knowledge of] Latin" = at his wit's end)  The confirmation of his prediction had to wait until 1908 and later (see Kaufmann–Bucherer–Neumann experiments).

Lorentz published a series of papers dealing with what he called "Einstein's principle of relativity". For instance, in 1909, 1910, 1914. In his 1906 lectures published with additions in 1909 in the book "The theory of electrons" (updated in 1915), he spoke affirmatively of Einstein's theory:

Though Lorentz still maintained that there is an (undetectable) aether in which resting clocks indicate the "true time":

Lorentz also gave credit to Poincaré's contributions to relativity.

Lorentz and general relativity
Lorentz was one of few scientists who supported Einstein's search for general relativity from the beginning – he wrote several research papers and discussed with Einstein personally and by letter. For instance, he attempted to combine Einstein's formalism with Hamilton's principle (1915),
and to reformulate it in a coordinate-free way (1916). Lorentz wrote in 1919:

Lorentz and quantum mechanics

Lorentz gave a series of lectures in the Fall of 1926 at Cornell University on the new quantum mechanics; in these he presented Erwin Schrödinger's wave mechanics.

Assessments

Einstein wrote of Lorentz:

Poincaré (1902) said of Lorentz's theory of electrodynamics:

Paul Langevin (1911) said of Lorentz:

{{Blockquote|It will be Lorentz's main claim to fame that he demonstrated that the fundamental equations of electromagnetism also allow of a group of transformations that enables them to resume the same form when a transition is made from one reference system to another. This group differs fundamentally from the above group as regards transformations of space and time.''''}}

Lorentz and Emil Wiechert had an interesting correspondence on the topics of electromagnetism and the theory of relativity, and Lorentz explained his ideas in letters to Wiechert.

Lorentz was chairman of the first Solvay Conference held in Brussels in the autumn of 1911. Shortly after the conference, Poincaré wrote an essay on quantum physics which gives an indication of Lorentz's status at the time:

Change of priorities
In 1910, Lorentz decided to reorganize his life. His teaching and management duties at Leiden University were taking up too much of his time, leaving him little time for research. In 1912, he resigned from his chair of theoretical physics to become curator of the "Physics Cabinet" at Teylers Museum in Haarlem. He remained connected to Leiden University as an external professor, and his "Monday morning lectures" on new developments in theoretical physics soon became legendary.

Lorentz initially asked Einstein to succeed him as professor of theoretical physics at Leiden. However, Einstein could not accept because he had just accepted a position at ETH Zurich. Einstein had no regrets in this matter, since the prospect of having to fill Lorentz's shoes made him shiver. Instead Lorentz appointed Paul Ehrenfest as his successor in the chair of theoretical  physics at the Leiden University, who would found the Institute for Theoretical Physics which would become known as the Lorentz Institute.

Civil work
After World War I, Lorentz was one of the driving forces behind the founding of the "Wetenschappelijke Commissie van Advies en Onderzoek in het Belang van Volkswelvaart en Weerbaarheid", a committee which was to harness the scientific potential united in the Royal Netherlands Academy of Arts and Sciences (KNAW) for solving civil problems such as food shortage which had resulted from the war. Lorentz was appointed chair of the committee. However, despite the best efforts of many of the participants the committee would harvest little success. The only exception being that it ultimately resulted in the founding of TNO, the Netherlands Organisation for Applied Scientific Research.

Lorentz was also asked by the Dutch government to chair a committee to calculate some of the effects of the proposed Afsluitdijk (Enclosure Dam) flood control dam on water levels in the Waddenzee. Hydraulic engineering was mainly an empirical science at that time, but the disturbance of the tidal flow caused by the Afsluitdijk was so unprecedented that the empirical rules could not be trusted. Originally Lorentz was only supposed to have a coordinating role in the committee, but it quickly became apparent that Lorentz was the only physicist to have any fundamental traction on the problem. In the period 1918 till 1926, Lorentz invested a large portion of his time in the problem. Lorentz proposed to start from the basic hydrodynamic equations of motion and solve the problem numerically. This was feasible for a "human computer", because of the quasi-one-dimensional nature of the water flow in the Waddenzee. The Afsluitdijk was completed in 1932, and the predictions of Lorentz and his committee turned out to be remarkably accurate. One of the two sets of locks in the Afsluitdijk was named after him.

Family life
In 1881, Lorentz married Aletta Catharina Kaiser. Her father was J.W. Kaiser, a professor at the Academy of Fine Arts. He was the Director of the museum which later became the well-known Rijksmuseum (National Gallery). He also was the designer of the first postage stamps of The Netherlands.

There were two daughters, and one son from this marriage.

Dr. Geertruida Luberta Lorentz, the eldest daughter, was a physicist. She married Professor Wander Johannes de Haas, who was the Director of the Cryogenic Laboratory at the University of Leiden.

Death
In January 1928, Lorentz became seriously ill, and died shortly after on 4 February. The respect in which he was held in the Netherlands is apparent from Owen Willans Richardson's description of his funeral:

Unique 1928 film footage of the funeral procession with a lead carriage followed by ten mourners, followed by a carriage with the coffin, followed in turn by at least four more carriages, passing by a crowd at the Grote Markt, Haarlem, from the Zijlstraat to the Smedestraat, and then back again through the Grote Houtstraat towards the Barteljorisstraat, on the way to the "Algemene Begraafplaats" at the Kleverlaan (northern Haarlem cemetery), has been digitized on YouTube. Amongst others, the funeral was attended by Albert Einstein and Marie Curie.

Legacy
Lorentz is considered one of the prime representatives of the "Second Dutch Golden Age", a period of several decades surrounding 1900 in which the natural sciences flourished in the Netherlands.

Richardson describes Lorentz as:

A man of remarkable intellectual powers. Although steeped in his own investigation of the moment, he always seemed to have in his immediate grasp its ramifications into every corner of the universe. The singular clearness of his writings provides a striking reflection of his wonderful powers in this respect. He possessed and successfully employed the mental vivacity which is necessary to follow the interplay of discussion, the insight which is required to extract those statements which illuminate the real difficulties, and the wisdom to lead the discussion among fruitful channels, and he did this so skillfully that the process was hardly perceptible.

M. J. Klein (1967) wrote of Lorentz's reputation in the 1920s:

For many years physicists had always been eager "to hear what Lorentz will say about it" when a new theory was advanced, and, even at seventy-two, he did not disappoint them.

In addition to the Nobel prize, Lorentz received a great many honours for his outstanding work. He was elected a Foreign Member of the Royal Society (ForMemRS) in 1905. The Society awarded him their Rumford Medal in 1908 and their Copley Medal in 1918. He was elected an Honorary Member of the Netherlands Chemical Society in 1912.

See also

 List of things named after Hendrik Antoon Lorentz
 Lorentz oscillator model
 Lorentz covariance
 Modern searches for Lorentz violation
 Heaviside–Lorentz units
 Lorentz-violating electrodynamics
 Geertruida de Haas-Lorentz
 Lorentz (crater)
 Lorentz Medal
 Trouton–Noble experiment

References

Primary sources

 Many papers by Lorentz (mostly in English) are available for online viewing in the Proceedings of the Royal Netherlands Academy of Arts and Science, Amsterdam.
 
 , (Vol. I online)

Secondary sources

 
 See English translation.
 : n.p.. The quotation is from the English translation
 :n.p.. The quotation in the article is from the English translation: ( :n.p.)
 Sri Kantha, S. Einstein and Lorentz. Nature'', 13 July 1995; 376: 111. (Letter)

External links
 
 
 Scanned publications of H. A. Lorentz
 Scanned Ph.D. theses of the students of Lorentz.
 
 
 
 
 
 
 
 Movie of Lorentz's funeral
 

 
1853 births
1928 deaths
20th-century Dutch physicists
Dutch Nobel laureates
19th-century Dutch physicists
Leiden University alumni
Academic staff of Leiden University
Nobel laureates in Physics
Recipients of the Copley Medal
People from Arnhem
Relativity theorists
Foreign Members of the Royal Society
Foreign associates of the National Academy of Sciences
Members of the Royal Netherlands Academy of Arts and Sciences
Corresponding members of the Saint Petersburg Academy of Sciences
Corresponding Members of the Russian Academy of Sciences (1917–1925)
Corresponding Members of the USSR Academy of Sciences
Honorary Members of the USSR Academy of Sciences
Recipients of the Pour le Mérite (civil class)
Theoretical physicists
Members of Teylers Tweede Genootschap
Fellows of the Royal Society of Edinburgh